Ubong Moses Ekpai  (born 17 October 1995) is a Nigerian professional footballer who plays as a midfielder for Czech First League club Mladá Boleslav, on loan from Slavia Prague.

Career
Ekpai left his home town club Akwa United to join Kano Pillars. After the 2016 season he returned to Akwa United, but was quickly signed by Maccabi Haifa of the Israeli Premier League and immediately sent on loan to the Czech First League side Slovan Liberec. He transferred to another Czech side Fastav Zlín in July 2017 for and undisclosed fee. After one year in Zlín, Ubong was traded to Czech First League champion Viktoria Plzeň for an unspecified amount in May 2018.

On 23 June 2021, Ekpai signed for Czech champions Slavia Prague, following the expiry of his contract with Viktoria Plzeň. On 21 January 2022, as part of the deal to sign compatriot Yira Sor, Ekpai was loaned to follow Czech First League club Baník Ostrava. On 25 August 2022, Ekpai was loaned to follow Czech First League club Mladá Boleslav.

Career statistics

References

External links 
 
 
 Ubong Moses Ekpai profile on the FC Slovan Liberec official website

Living people
1995 births
People from Uyo
Nigerian footballers
Association football midfielders
Czech First League players
FC Slovan Liberec players
Maccabi Haifa F.C. players
FC Fastav Zlín players
FC Viktoria Plzeň players
SK Dynamo České Budějovice players
SK Slavia Prague players
FC Baník Ostrava players
Nigerian expatriate footballers
Nigerian expatriate sportspeople in the Czech Republic
Expatriate footballers in the Czech Republic
FK Mladá Boleslav players